The 2013–14 Texas A&M Aggies women's basketball team represented Texas A&M University during the 2013–14 college basketball season. The team was led by 11th year head coach Gary Blair, and played their home games at the Reed Arena in College Station, Texas as second season members of the Southeastern Conference. They finished the season 27–9 overall, 13–3 during SEC play, and finished in a tie for second place. As the No. 2 seed in the 2014 SEC women's basketball tournament, they advanced to the semifinals, where they were defeated by Tennessee.

The team received an at-large bid to the NCAA tournament as a No. 3 seed in the Lincoln Regional. They defeated North Dakota in the first round, James Madison in the second round and DePaul in the Sweet Sixteen to advance to the Elite Eight. There, they lost to eventual national champion, and the No. 1 ranked UConn Huskies 54–69.

Roster

Schedule and Results

|-
!colspan=12 style="background:#500000; color:#FFFFFF;"| Exhibition

|-
!colspan=12 style="background:#500000; color:#FFFFFF;"| Non-Conference Games

|-
!colspan=12 style="background:#500000; color:#FFFFFF;"| Conference Games

|-
!colspan=12 style="background:#500000;"| 2014 SEC Tournament

|-
!colspan=12 style="background:#500000;"| NCAA tournament

See also
 2013–14 NCAA Division I women's basketball season	
 2013–14 NCAA Division I women's basketball rankings
 2013–14 Texas A&M Aggies men's basketball team

References

Texas A&M Aggies women's basketball seasons
Texas AandM
Texas AandM Aggies women's basketball
Texas AandM Aggies women's basketball
Texas AandM